José Manuel Jiménez may refer to:
José Manuel Jiménez Berroa (José Manuel Lico Jiménez Berroa, 1851–1917), Cuban pianist and composer
Chema (footballer, born 1976) (José Manuel Chema Jiménez Sancho, born 1976), Spanish retired footballer
José Manuel Jiménez Ortiz (José Manuel Mané Jiménez Ortiz, born 1981), Spanish footballer

See also
José Jiménez (disambiguation)
Manuel Jiménez (disambiguation)